Big data ethics also known as simply data ethics refers to systemizing, defending, and recommending concepts of right and wrong conduct in relation to data, in particular personal data. Since the dawn of the Internet the sheer quantity and quality of data has dramatically increased and is continuing to do so exponentially. Big data describes this large amount of data that is so voluminous and complex that traditional data processing application software is inadequate to deal with them. Recent innovations in medical research and healthcare, such as high-throughput genome sequencing, high-resolution imaging, electronic medical patient records and a plethora of internet-connected health devices have triggered a data deluge that will reach the exabyte range in the near future. Data ethics is of increasing relevance as the quantity of data increases because of the scale of the impact.

Big data ethics are different from information ethics because the focus of information ethics is more concerned with issues of intellectual property and concerns relating to librarians, archivists, and information professionals, while big data ethics is more concerned with collectors and disseminators of structured or unstructured data such as data brokers, governments, and large corporations.

Principles 
Data ethics is concerned with the following principles: 
 Ownership - Individuals own their own data 
 Transaction transparency  - If an individual's personal data is used, they should have transparent access to the algorithm design used to generate aggregate data sets 
 Consent - If an individual or legal entity would like to use personal data, one needs informed and explicitly expressed consent of what personal data moves to whom, when, and for what purpose from the owner of the data
 Privacy - If data transactions occur all reasonable effort needs to be made to preserve privacy
  Currency - Individuals should be aware of financial transactions resulting from the use of their personal data and the scale of these transactions  
 Openness - Aggregate data sets should be freely available

Ownership  

Ownership of data involves determining rights and duties over property. The concept of data ownership is linked to the ability to exercise control over and limit the sharing of personal data. The question of ownership arises when one person records their observations on another person. The observer and the observed both state a claim. Questions also arise as to the responsibilities that the observer and the observed have in relation to each other. Since the massive scale and systematisation of observation of people and their thoughts as a result of the Internet, these questions are increasingly important to address. The question of personal data ownership falls into an unknown territory in between corporate ownership, intellectual property, and slavery. The question of ownership of a digital identity.

European laws, the General Data Protection Regulation, indicate that individuals own their own personal data.

Transaction transparency 

Concerns have been raised around how biases can be integrated into algorithm design resulting in systematic oppression. 

In terms of governance, big data ethics is concerned with which types of inferences and predictions should be made using big data technologies such as algorithms.

Anticipatory governance is the practice of using predictive analytics to assess possible future behaviours. This has ethical implications because it affords the ability to target particular groups and places which can encourage prejudice and discrimination For example, predictive policing highlights certain groups or neighbourhoods which should be watched more closely than others which leads to more sanctions in these areas, and closer surveillance for those who fit the same profiles as those who are sanctioned.

The term "control creep" refers to data that has been generated with a particular purpose in mind but which is repurposed. This practice is seen with airline industry data which has been repurposed for profiling and managing security risks at airports.

Privacy 

Privacy has been presented as a limitation to data usage which could also be considered unethical. For example, the sharing of healthcare data can shed light on the causes of diseases, the effects of treatments, an can allow for tailored analyses based on individuals' needs. This is of ethical significance in the big data ethics field because while many value privacy, the affordances of data sharing are also quite valuable, although they may contradict one's conception of privacy. Attitudes against data sharing may be based in a perceived loss of control over data and a fear of the exploitation of personal data. However, it is possible to extract the value of data without compromising privacy.

Some scholars such as Jonathan H. King and Neil M. Richards are redefining the traditional meaning of privacy, and others to question whether or not privacy still exists. In a 2014 article for the Wake Forest Law Review, King and Richard argue that privacy in the digital age can be understood not in terms of secrecy but in term of regulations which govern and control the use of personal information. In the European Union, the right to be forgotten entitles EU countries to force the removal or de-linking of personal data from databases at an individual's request if the information is deemed irrelevant or out of date. According to Andrew Hoskins, this law demonstrates the moral panic of EU members over the perceived loss of privacy and the ability to govern personal data in the digital age. In the United States, citizens have the right to delete voluntarily submitted data. This is very different from the right to be forgotten because much of the data produced using big data technologies and platforms are not voluntarily submitted.

How much data is worth 

The difference in value between the services facilitated by tech companies and the equity value of these tech companies is the difference in the exchange rate offered to the citizen and the "market rate" of the value of their data. Scientifically there are many holes in this rudimentary calculation: the financial figures of tax-evading companies are unreliable, either revenue or profit could be more appropriate, how a user is defined, a large number of individuals are needed for the data to be valuable, possible tiered prices for different people in different countries, etc. Although these calculations are crude, they serve to make the monetary value of data more tangible. Another approach is to find the data trading rates in the black market. RSA publishes a yearly cybersecurity shopping list that takes this approach.

This raises the economic question of whether free tech services in exchange for personal data is a worthwhile implicit exchange for the consumer. In the personal data trading model, rather than companies selling data, an owner can sell their personal data and keep the profit.

Openness  

The idea of open data is centred around the argument that data should be freely available and should not have restrictions that would prohibit its use, such as copyright laws.  many governments had begun to move towards publishing open datasets for the purpose of transparency and accountability. This movement has gained traction via "open data activists" who have called for governments to make datasets available to allow citizens to themselves extract meaning from the data and perform checks and balances themselves. King and Richards have argued that this call for transparency includes a tension between openness and secrecy.

Activists and scholars have also argued that because this open-sourced model of data evaluation is based on voluntary participation, the availability of open datasets has a democratizing effect on a society, allowing any citizen to participate. To some, the availability of certain types of data is seen as a right and an essential part of a citizen's agency.

The Open Knowledge Foundation (OKF) lists several dataset types that should be provided by governments in order for them to truly be open. The OFK has a tool called The Global Open Data Index (GODI) which is a crowd-sourced survey for measuring the openness of governments, according to the Open Definition. The aim of the GODI is to provide a tool for providing important feedback to governments about the quality of their open datasets.

Willingness to share data varies from person to person. Preliminary studies have been conducted into the determinants of the willingness to share data. For example, some have suggested that baby boomers are less willing to share data than millennials.

The role of institutions

Nation states 

Data sovereignty refers to a government's control over the data that is generated and collected within a country. The issue of data sovereignty was heightened when Edward Snowden leaked US government information about a number of governments and individuals whom the US government was spying on. This prompted many governments to reconsider their approach to data sovereignty and the security of their citizens' data.

J. De Jong-Chen points out how the restriction of data flow can hinder scientific discovery, to the disadvantage of many but particularly, developing countries. This is of considerable concern to big data ethics because of the tension between the two important issues of cybersecurity and global development.

See also 
Dynamic consent

Footnotes

References 

 

Hoskins, A. (November 4, 2014). "Digital Memory Studies". www.memorystudies-frankfurt.com. Retrieved 2017-11-28.

Kitchin, R. The Data Revolution: Big Data, Open Data, Data Infrastructures and Their Consequences, (pp. 165–183). SAGE Publications. Kindle Edition.

 

Big data
Data
Ethics
Internet privacy